Edward Turnour, 4th Earl Winterton (1810–1879) was a first-class cricketer who played 25 times for Sussex County Cricket Club, without much success. The 4th Earl also had one of the finest beagle packs of the time, rivaled only by those of Prince Albert and the Rev. Phillip Honeywood, from whose pack the entire line of modern beagles is descended.

He was commissioned as Captain of the 6th (Petworth) Sussex Rifle Volunteer Corps on 26 April 1860.

References

External links

1810 births
1879 deaths
British Militia officers
English cricketers
Sussex cricketers
Petworth cricketers
Marylebone Cricket Club cricketers
English cricketers of 1826 to 1863
Presidents of the Marylebone Cricket Club
Fast v Slow cricketers
Earls Winterton